Professor Vaikalathur Shankar Sunder (born 6 April 1952) is an Indian mathematician who specialises in subfactors, operator algebras and functional analysis in general.

In 1996, he was awarded the Shanti Swarup Bhatnagar Prize for Science and Technology, the highest science award in India,  in the mathematical sciences category.

Sunder is one of the first Indian operator algebraists. In addition to publishing about sixty papers, he has written six books including at least three monographs at the graduate level or higher on von Neumann algebras. One of the books was co-authored with Vaughan Jones, an operator algebraist,  who has received the Fields Medal.

References

External links
Indian National Science Academy database
V.S. Sunder

1952 births
Living people
20th-century Indian mathematicians
Recipients of the Shanti Swarup Bhatnagar Award in Mathematical Science
IIT Madras alumni
Indiana University alumni
Academic staff of the Indian Statistical Institute